Mark Blankfield (born May 8, 1950) is an American actor and comedian. He is best known as a regular cast member of the television variety series Fridays.  Other work includes roles in Jekyll and Hyde...Together Again, The Incredible Shrinking Woman, Robin Hood: Men in Tights, Dracula: Dead and Loving It, and The Jerk, Too, a TV-movie sequel to The Jerk.

Blankfield has also made appearances in television series such as Taxi, Night Court, The Nutt House,  The Jamie Foxx Show, Saved by the Bell, Sledge Hammer!, Crusade, Double Rush, and Arrested Development.

Recurring Characters on Fridays
Pastor Babbitt, a highly conservative, yet very hypocritical televangelist whose sermons would always lead to admissions of being abused in his youth or indulging in the very sins and vices he's preaching against, such as homosexuality (which, back then, was considered immoral), prostitution, and premarital sex.
Ken the Monster, a hunchback and working actor with an exaggerated walk that could be described as a spoof of Grandpa Amos McCoy of The Real McCoys. He was also cross-eyed, which impaired his depth perception. Ken found himself in various scenarios, including a parody of "The Postman Always Rings Twice", called "The Monster Always Rings Twice".
The Pharmacist, a jittery, drug-addled owner of "Drugs R Us" who tried to keep sane while working at his drug store (and getting high on the drugs and other assorted products, like glue, unmarked pills, and the testing liquid to a pregnancy kit, in his store). His catchphrases were, "I can handle it. I can handle it!" and "Take a pill!"
One of The Transphibians, a trio of men (the other two members are played by Darrow Igus and Michael Richards) who, like actual transsexuals, feel that they were born in the wrong body, got surgery to look how they perceive themselves to be, and are discriminated for it by other people. Unlike actual transsexuals, the Transphibians are men who identify as amphibians and got surgery to look like them.

References

External links

1950 births
Living people
20th-century American male actors
21st-century American male actors
American male film actors
American male television actors
American sketch comedians
Male actors from Texas
People from Pasadena, Texas